Booth Spur is a small rock spur at the north side of El-Sayed Glacier and  southwest of Mount Shirley, in coastal Marie Byrd Land. It was mapped by the United States Geological Survey from surveys and from U.S. Navy aerial photographs, 1959–65, and named by the Advisory Committee on Antarctic Names for Lieutenant Commander Robert M. Booth, U.S. Navy, Public Works Officer during Operation Deep Freeze 1968 and 1969.

References 

Ridges of Marie Byrd Land